Karl William Turner (born 15 April 1971) is a British politician. A member of the Labour Party, Turner has been the Member of Parliament (MP) for Kingston upon Hull East since 2010.

Turner was appointed Shadow Attorney General for England and Wales in January 2016 by Jeremy Corbyn, before resigning from that role in June of that year. He served as Shadow Shipping, Aviation and Road Safety Minister within the Shadow Transport team from 2017 to 2020.

Early life
Karl William Turner was born on 15 April 1971 in Kingston upon Hull, East Riding of Yorkshire. He was raised in the city and was educated at Bransholme High School from 1984 to 1987, leaving at the age of 16. He attended HCC Training to study business administration from 1987 to 1989. Later, Turner became a self-employed antiques dealer.

He returned to education in the late 1990s to study A Levels at Hull College, before graduating with a law degree as a mature student from the University of Hull in 2004. He became a barrister in 2005 after passing the Bar Vocational Course at Northumbria University and went on to practice criminal law for the Max Gold Partnership in Hull.

Parliamentary career

Turner was selected by the Labour Party as the prospective parliamentary candidate for Kingston upon Hull East in March 2008 after John Prescott announced he would not stand again. He was elected for the constituency at the 2010 general election with a majority of 8,597, a long way from the large majority his predecessor had and this was further reduced to just 1,239 during the 2019 general election.

In April 2014, Turner referred himself to the Parliamentary Commissioner for Standards after complaints were made in relation to invitations to a £45-a-head Labour Party fundraising event, sent using parliamentary email accounts. The Commissioner for Standards concluded that there should be no inquiry.

Turner was appointed Shadow Solicitor General by Labour leader Ed Miliband on 3 December 2014, and continued to serve as an opposition whip.

On 11 January 2016, Turner was appointed Shadow Attorney General for England and Wales to replace Catherine McKinnell, who resigned following a reshuffle to the Shadow Cabinet of Jeremy Corbyn. On 26 June 2016, Turner resigned from the Shadow Cabinet following the EU referendum, among a number of his colleagues unhappy with Jeremy Corbyn's leadership. He supported Owen Smith in the 2016 Labour leadership election. On 14 October 2016, it was announced that Turner had returned to Labour's frontbench as a Whip.

Following the 2017 general election he was appointed as Shadow Shipping, Aviation and Road Safety Minister within the Shadow Transport team.

On 12 March 2018, allegations of sexual misconduct against Turner were reported in the British press. Turner, via his solicitors, denied making any such comments or behaving inappropriately. The Labour Party said it had not received a formal complaint and that complaints about inappropriate behaviour are taken "extremely seriously".

In September 2019, Speaker of the House John Bercow described Turner as the "noisiest member of the House".

Turner is a member of the Labour Friends of Israel group in Parliament.

Personal life
He is married to Leanne Turner.

References

External links

|-

1971 births
Living people
Alumni of Northumbria University
Alumni of the University of Hull
Labour Friends of Israel
Labour Party (UK) MPs for English constituencies
Politicians from Kingston upon Hull
UK MPs 2010–2015
UK MPs 2015–2017
UK MPs 2017–2019
UK MPs 2019–present